1188 is a year. 1188 may also refer to:
1188 AM
1188 Gothlandia, an asteroid
Kosmos 1188, a satellite
Louisiana Highway 1188
Farm to Market Road 1188, a road in Texas